Nebty-tepites (nb.tỉ tp ỉt=s, "The two crowns on the head of her father") was a Princess of ancient Egypt. She is mentioned in the tomb of her mother, Meresankh II.

Biography 
Nebty-tepites was a daughter of Prince Horbaef and his half-sister Meresankh II. She had a sister Nefertkau III and a brother Djaty. After Horbaef's death, Meresankh married one Pharaoh, either Djedefra or Khafre and she became a queen. So, Nebty-tepites was a niece and step-daughter of her mother's second husband.

References 

Princesses of the Fourth Dynasty of Egypt
3rd-millennium BC births
3rd-millennium BC deaths
27th-century BC women
26th-century BC women